Tillamook Air Museum is an aviation museum south of Tillamook, Oregon in the United States. The museum is located at a former U.S. Navy Air Station and housed in a former blimp hangar, known as "Hangar B", which is the largest clear-span wooden structure in the world.

History
The six-blimp hangar was built by the United States Navy in 1942 during World War II  for Naval Air Station Tillamook. Its companion building, Hangar "A", was destroyed by fire on August 22, 1992.

Between April 2013 and September 2014, the museum moved the part of its collection owned by Jack Erickson from Tillamook to Madras, Oregon.

In November 2014, the owners of Hangar B, the Port of Tillamook Bay, announced that they would continue operation of the Tillamook Air Museum with the remaining collection.

In 2016, the Classic Aircraft Aviation Museum moved some aircraft to the museum.

In 2021, the museum received a B-52 cockpit on loan from Scroggins Aviation Mockup & Effects.

Collection

Aircraft on display

 Aero Spacelines Mini Guppy
 Alenia C-27A Spartan
 BAC Jet Provost
 Boeing B-52 Stratofortress cockpit 
 Bell TH-57 Sea Ranger
 Bellanca 14-13 Cruisair Senior
 Brown Starlite
 Cessna 180F Skywagon
 Chris-Teena Mini Coupe
 Convair 880 – Forward fuselage
 Cvjetkovic CA-65 Skyfly
 Douglas A-4B Skyhawk
 Douglas A-26C Invader
 ERCO Ercoupe 415C
 Fairchild GK-1
 Fisher R-80 Tiger Moth
 Grumman F-14A Tomcat
 Kaman HTK-1 Huskie
 Learjet 24
 LTV A-7 Corsair II
 Nieuport 11 – Replica
 Nord 1101 Noralpha
 PZL-Mielec Lim-6bis
 PT-17 Stearman
 Rans S-4 Coyote
 Rutan Model 61 Long-EZ
 Rutan Quickie
 Ryan PT-22 ST-3KR
 WindRyder

Exhibits

The Museum also features an exhibit hall with a large collection of rare historical wartime and aviation themed artifacts including pieces of the great German airship, the Hindenburg, a World War II Luftwaffe flight jacket and a WWII Japanese Army Winter flight suit.

 Anderson Air Raid Shelter walk-thru interactive exhibit
 Curtiss SB2C Helldiver crash exhibit

See also
 Evergreen Aviation Museum, in McMinnville, Oregon
Hangar One (Mountain View, California)
 List of aerospace museums
 Marine Corps Air Station Tustin
 Moffett Federal Airfield
 Western Antique Aeroplane & Automobile Museum in Hood River, Oregon

References

External links

 Tillamook Air Museum post on AirMuseumGuide.com
 Aviation: From Sand Dunes to Sonic Booms, a National Park Service Discover Our Shared Heritage Travel Itinerary
 

Oregon Coast
Aerospace museums in Oregon
Tillamook, Oregon
Museums in Tillamook County, Oregon
1994 establishments in Oregon
Museums established in 1994